Fouad Bouzenada (فؤاد بوزنادة , born ) is an Algerian male weightlifter, competing in the 77 kg category and representing Algeria at international competitions. He participated at the 1996 Summer Olympics in the 64 kg event. He competed at world championships, most recently at the 2003 World Weightlifting Championships.

Major results

References

External links
 
 
 

1976 births
Living people
Algerian male weightlifters
Weightlifters at the 1996 Summer Olympics
Olympic weightlifters of Algeria
Place of birth missing (living people)
21st-century Algerian people